= Dost Muhammad Abad railway station =

Railway station in Pakistan

General information
- Owner: Ministry of Railways

Other information
- Station code: DMAH

History
- Former names: Great Indian Peninsula Railway
Location

Dost Muhammad Abad railway station (Urdu: دوست محمد آباد ریلوے اسٹیشن) is a closed railway station located in Pakistan.

== See also ==
- List of railway stations in Pakistan
- Pakistan Railways
